Mt. Zion Memorial Church, also known as Mt. Zion Methodist Episcopal Church or Mt. Zion United Methodist Church, is a historic Methodist Episcopal church located at Princess Anne, Somerset County, Maryland. It is a single-story asymmetrically planned "T"-shaped timber-frame structure constructed in 1887 and remodeled in 1916.  It features a three-story entrance tower with an open belfry.  It served the African-American community along Polks Road in northern Somerset County.

Its design is attributed to architect Benjamin D. Price, who sold church plans by catalogue orders.

It was listed on the National Register of Historic Places in 2007.

References

External links
 at Maryland Historical Trust

African Methodist Episcopal churches in Maryland
Churches on the National Register of Historic Places in Maryland
Churches in Somerset County, Maryland
Churches completed in 1887
19th-century Methodist church buildings in the United States
Carpenter Gothic church buildings in Maryland
African-American history of Maryland
National Register of Historic Places in Somerset County, Maryland